Wolkramshausen is a village and a former municipality in the district of Nordhausen, in Thuringia, Germany. Since 1 January 2019, it is part of the town Bleicherode.

References

Nordhausen (district)
Former municipalities in Thuringia